Peacetime in Paris is a 1981 Yugoslav-French drama film directed by Predrag Golubović. It was entered into the 12th Moscow International Film Festival where it won a Special Prize.

Cast
 Maria Schneider as Elen
 Dragan Nikolic as Dragan
 Alain Noury as Mikelandjelo
 Alida Valli
 Erland Josephson
 Predrag Manojlovic as Josko (as Miki Manojlovic)
 Daniel Gélin
 Pascale Petit

References

External links
 

1981 films
1981 drama films
French drama films
1980s Serbian-language films
1980s French-language films
Yugoslav drama films
1981 multilingual films
Yugoslav multilingual films
French multilingual films
1980s French films